Kothrud (Kothrud Baug during the Maratha Empire era) is an upmarket residential neighborhood in the city of Pune.

The neighborhood is located to the West-Central region of the city. During the recent times, Kothrud has seen a rapid expansion as well as development in commercial and residential real estate. Landmarks in Kothrud include the Mrityunjaya Temple dating to Peshwa times. This was also the residence place of Mastani.

Several prominent citizens of Pune, who are active in Bollywood, Marathi Cinema, Media, Cricket and Politics reside in this area.

Geography

Kothrud primarily consists of areas around Paud Road and Karve Road. Paud Road begins at Paud Phata and leads to Paud through Chandni Chowk (on Katraj-Dehu Bypass). Karve Road begins in Deccan and ends at Warje. Kothrud is one of the largest areas of Pune, and its forest cover has been deeply impacted due the fast-paced growth and development of this area.

Population

The population is estimated to be around 250,000.The major localities in Kothrud are Anand Nagar, Rambaug, Ideal, Wanaz, Chandani Chowk, Bharti nagar, Sutardara and Jaybhawaninagar. Last two are slum areas.

Economy

Kothrud is home to numerous information technology companies such as Harbinger Systems, Harbinger Knowledge Products and e-Zest Solutions. Kothrud is home to a minor manufacturing activity by Kirloskar Group and the Automotive Research Association of India. Many new age startups like StomatoBot Technologies, which automates CCTV Surveillance for proactive mobile alerts in near real-time, using Computer Vision and Deep Learning, have also propped up in Kothrud.

Transport

Kothrud is connected by the Pune Mahanagar Parivahan Mahamandal Limited and operates two main bus depots: Kothrud Depot and Kothrud Stand. Buses connect Kothrud to other parts of Pune like Nigdi, Hadapsar, Swargate, Chakan, and villages near Pune in Khed-Shivapur. A new terminus "Kumbre Park", located on the D.P. Road has also started operating PMPML buses to major parts of Pune City. Pune Metro will also go through it, which is expected to completed by late 2021. Karve Road connects Kothrud to the heart of city, while Paud Road connects it to the outskirts of city.

Education

Kothrud is known for its educational institutions. It draws students in from across the Indian subcontinent, as well as from Asia and Africa. The large student population is an integral part of the economy and culture. Institutions:

Law College

Engineering Institutes

Maharashtra Institute of Technology 
Marathwada Mitra Mandal's College of Engineering
MKSSS's Cummins College of Engineering for Women

Management College
MIT-WPU Faculty of Management

Schools
Kalmadi Shamrao High School
Bharati Vidyapeeth English Medium School
Abhinava Vidyalaya English Medium School
Bal Shikshan School
Jog Vidyalaya
Paranjape Vidya Mandir
Millennium National School
City International School Kothrud
MIT WORLD PEACE CENTRE
New India School

See also 
 Pune
 List of roads in Pune

References

Neighbourhoods in Pune